Skerryvore is a Scottish Celtic Rock group formed in Tiree, Argyll and Bute in 2004. The band started off with Tiree brothers, Daniel Gillespie and Martin Gillespie. Regular Tiree visitors include Fraser West and his friend Alec Dalglish, both from Livingston, West Lothian. The group's present line-up includes Craig Espie, Alan Scobie, Jodie Bremaneson and, since April 2017, Scott Wood. Skerryvore have released six studio albums, with the addition of a ‘deluxe’ version of one including some live tracks, a compilation album, and a live album.

Their earlier work was ‘West Coast Ceilidh’ inspired, with Celtic influences which have remained present in all their work. As the band have developed, rock, pop, jazz, Cajun and country influences have all emerged, but the traditional Celtic roots and instrumentation have remained.

Now based in and around Glasgow, Scotland, Skerryvore tour throughout Scotland, in Europe, and in the United States, the Middle East, and in China.

History

The four founding members of Skerryvore all had some experience of public performance. Tiree has produced lots of musicians, playing traditional Scottish instruments such as bagpipes, whistle and accordion. Both Daniel Gillespie and Martin Gillespie were pupils of Gordon Connell and Robert Beck. Martin added whistles to his instrumentation and Daniel pursued the accordion only. The brothers played regularly on the island for friends, at local ceilidhs and parties, and in the ‘Lean To’, part of the Scarinish Hotel.

Fraser and Alec were products of the Music Department of Deans Community High School in Livingston, West Lothian and of the supportive policy towards music education and performance of West Lothian Council. Both played in their school's wind band and in West Lothian School's wind band and big band, and in other local bands. For much of this time, Fraser's main instrument was trumpet and Alec's was euphonium.

Fraser met Daniel on holiday on Tiree, when Daniel and other musicians played in the Lean To. In 2000, after Daniel moved to the mainland to study, the two played ceilidh music together at functions. In summer 2003, with Martin and Alec, they toured small venues in the Scottish Highlands and Islands. Up to this point, they were known variously as ‘The Gillespie Brothers’, ‘The Gillespie Brothers and Fraser,’ and ‘Brois,’ allegedly a Tiree Gaelic word loosely translated as ‘a complete cock up’.

In 2004 the band adopted the name ‘Skerryvore’ and started work on their first album, ‘West Coast Life’. This was recorded at Watercolour Music, Ardgour and produced by Allan Henderson. It was released in summer 2005. The album featured as ‘Album of the Month’ on Mary Ann Kennedy’s BBC Radio Scotland programme ‘Celtic Connections’, and consisted predominantly of arrangements of traditional tunes, including a vocal rendition of ‘Home to Donegal’, and a vocal arrangement of John Lennon and Paul McCartney's ‘Blackbird’.

Following the release of ‘West Coast Life,’ Skerryvore's volume of gigging increased, both in number and in scale. The band experimented with guest musicians and, in 2006, started work on their second album. Fiddler Craig Espie and bassist Barry Caulfield were added to the line-up. This increased the range and scope of the musical styles they could bring to their sound.

When the second album, ‘On the Road’ was released in 2007, a brass section (The Horn Supremacy) was included. Tracks on ‘On the Road’ are also predominantly rearrangements of traditional tunes but with a rockier, funkier feel to them. Following a gig in their adopted home town of Glasgow, reviewer Stuart Morrison, in 'The Herald' stated that 'we could well have found a Runrig for the 21st century'.

The band continued to build their following by touring throughout Scotland and by adding a growing number of foreign gigs. They featured increasingly at larger events such as T in the Park and similar festivals. They became ‘ambassadors for Scotland’ when they accompanied a Scottish Government delegation to the 2008 Ryder Cup in Louisville, Kentucky, USA. Their company, Skerryvore, won the PSYBT Young Entrepreneurs of the Year in 2009.

Skerryvore's third album, ‘Skerryvore,’ released in 2010, is almost entirely made up of the band's own compositions of songs and tunes with the addition of only a couple of rearrangements of traditional tunes. They retained their instrumentation of accordion, pipes, whistle, fiddle, guitar, bass and drums, dispensed with the brass section and added keyboards to both their album arrangements and to many of their live performances. The album received a considerable amount of critical acclaim, including from the 'Daily Record's' John Dingwall who described Skerryvore as 'the hottest new Celtic rockers on the block'.

In 2011, ‘Skerryvore’ brought the band awards including Scottish New Music Awards Album of the Year and, for Alec Dalglish, ‘Frankie Miller Songwriter of the Year’. In December 2011, Skerryvore also won the award as 'Best Live Act' in the 2011 MG ALBA Scots Trad Music Awards.   The band continued their work with the charity ‘Live Music Now’, working with youngsters and other groups in settings including HMP Cornton Vale.

Their fourth album, ‘World of Chances,’ released in 2012 is a departure from the style of their previous ones. Although retaining their traditional instrumentation, the album is almost entirely made up of songs penned by Alec Dalglish, with one tune composed by Martin Gillespie. Alongside their traditional roots, many more ‘world’ influences are apparent in this album, from country to cajun to jazz and rock. The album entered the top 10 in iTunes singer/songwriter chart in June 2012. A limited edition deluxe version of ‘World of Chances’, incorporating live and acoustic versions of some tracks, alongside a live version of Runrig’s ‘Rocket to the Moon’ was released in late 2012.
Skerryvore feature on BBC Scotland and BBC Alba's output, playing tracks from albums on radio programmes, excerpts from concert and festival performances, interviews and also featuring the band in the first 'A Gharaids' programme from BBC Alba in February 2011.
Late in 2012, Barry Caulfield left the band and was replaced by Colin Cunningham, formerly with Wolfstone, on bass. Prior to recording their fifth album, Colin left and was replaced by Jodie Bremaneson. Producer of their albums since 2010, and keyboard player, Alan Scobie joined the band on stage in all gigs and, following a diagnosis of focal dystonia for Martin, Scott Wood was added on pipes and whistles. When on tour, the band are seldom without 9th member, Paul Hoolahan.

'Chasing the Sun', released in September 2014, was described as the band's most mature sounding album, reflecting the various styles that have influenced their development, as well as re-emphasising their traditional roots. 'Chasing the Sun' was also the band's first international collaboration with platinum ward winning producer Chris Kress, Dave Matthews Band on two of the tracks ('Blown Away' and 'By Your Side').

Skerryvore celebrated their 10th birthday in 2015. In May 2015, they held a ‘Decade’ event in Oban. The open air concert, held at Mossfield Stadium, attracted an audience of 6000 who enjoyed various artists including The Red Hot Chilli Pipers, Trail West, Dougie MacLean, Sharon Shannon, Skipinnish, Scott Wood Band and, of course, Skerryvore.

To coincide with the occasion, Skerryvore's ‘Decade’ album was also released. Described as a celebration of their 10 years, the CD is a collection of many live versions of Skerryvore classics, some recorded at Festivals, including Tonder Festival in Denmark, with others recorded as ‘live’ studio sessions. It also included previously unreleased tracks, including the single ‘Happy to be Home,’ featuring Sharon Shannon.

In collaboration with Bruichladdich distillery, they released a limited edition, 10 year old, single cask, single malt, ‘Decade’ whisky. With only 290 bottles produced this has become a collector's item.

Following the success of their ‘Decade’ event, Skerryvore launched ‘Oban Live,’ a two-day festival which was held at Mossfield Park, Oban in May 2016, June 2017, June 2018 and June 2019.

Skerryvore once again won the 'Best Live Act' for 2016 at the MG ALBA Scots Trad Music Awards.

During the COVID-19 pandemic, Skerryvore released a single, 'Everyday Heroes.' The music, composed by Martin Gillespie, featured, alongside Skerryvore, a range of musicians from the Scottish Traditional music scene, as well as former UK Government press secretary Alastair Campbell, and reached number 1 in the official charts. 'Everyday Heroes' won the 'Original Work of the Year' award at the 2020 MG ALBA Scottish Trad Music Awards.

Discography

Albums

Singles

References

External links
 skerryvore.com

Celtic rock music
Scottish rock music groups
Musical groups established in 2004